The Rajshahi Division cricket team is a Bangladeshi first-class team representing the Rajshahi Division, one of the country's seven administrative regions. The team competes in the National Cricket League and was formerly a participant in the now-defunct National Cricket League One-Day. In the short-lived National Cricket League Twenty20 competition, played in the 2009–10 season only, Rajshahi adopted the name Rajshahi Rangers and played in their official grey, black, and red colours. The equivalent team in the Bangladesh Premier League (BPL) is the Rajshahi Kings.

Rajshahi's main home ground is the Rajshahi Divisional Stadium in Rajshahi city, which has a 15,000 capacity. They have won the NCL twice, most recently in 2008–09. They won the One-Day League four times and, as the Rangers, were the winners of the NCL T20 in 2010.

They recorded their biggest victory in a first-class match when they defeated Chittagong Division by an innings and 242 runs in the 2016–17 National Cricket League.

Honours
 National Cricket League (2) – 2005–06, 2008–09 
 One-Day Cricket League (4) – 2004–05, 2005–06, 2007–08, 2010–11
 NCL T20 (1) – 2009–10

Current squad

The squad for the 2019–20 season is:

Notes
 Wisden Cricketers Almanack (annual)

References

External links
 CricketArchive re Bangladesh
 CricInfo re Bangladesh

Bangladeshi first-class cricket teams
Rajshahi Division
Bangladesh National Cricket League
Cricket clubs established in 1999
1999 establishments in Bangladesh